Ray Chan (born 1984) is a Hong Kong businessman, known for being the CEO and co-founder of entertainment online platform 9GAG. Along with his team of four based in Hong Kong, he started the website as a side project.

Personal life 

Chan’s first job upon graduation from the Faculty of Law at the University of Hong Kong was in the legal department of a bank. Following that, he became an anchor as well as a reporter working for Now TV. Soon after, he worked at an information technology company as a project manager. In 2007, he joined aNobii as product manager. While working for this firm he launched 9GAG as a side project and four years later in 2011 he quit his job in order to focus on it.

9GAG was Chan's first successful website; prior to 9GAG, he established a website to share cosmetics and a website for information on electrical appliances, both of which failed.

Education  

During his university days at the University of Hong Kong, he was a member of the university lacrosse team and a captain of the university debate team.

Chan grew up in Hong Kong where he and his family lived in a public housing estate.

Speaking 

Given his experience and entrepreneurial expertise, Ray is often invited to share his story at various events and places. He was Unusual speaker at ContentStealer one-day conference at CoCoon and also featured at the ‘Echelon 2014: The Pulse of Asia's Innovation’ event and also at the ICT New Waves Symposium in 2013. In addition, he has been invited to universities in Hong Kong including his alma mater. as well as Polytechnic University  as a speaker. Lastly, he has made many an appearance on YouTube channels such as DailySocialTV and Last Business Blog.

References

Alumni of the University of Hong Kong
Hong Kong chief executives
1987 births
Living people